This is a list of singles that charted in the top ten of the Billboard Hot 100 during 2003.

Jay-Z scored five top ten hits during the year with "'03 Bonnie & Clyde", "Excuse Me Miss", "Crazy in Love", "Frontin'", and "Change Clothes", the most among all other artists.

Top-ten singles
Key
 – indicates single's top 10 entry was also its Hot 100 debut

2002 peaks

2004 peaks

See also
 2003 in music
 List of Hot 100 number-one singles of 2003 (U.S.)
 Billboard Year-End Hot 100 singles of 2003

Notes
 The single re-entered the top ten on the week ending February 8, 2003.
 The single re-entered the top ten on the week ending May 10, 2003.
 The single re-entered the top ten on the week ending May 17, 2003.

References

General sources

Joel Whitburn Presents the Billboard Hot 100 Charts: The 2000s
Additional information obtained can be verified within Billboard's online archive services and print editions of the magazine.

2003
United States Hot 100 Top 10